Eric William Probert (17 February 1952 – September 2004) was an English professional footballer who played as a midfielder. He played over 200 matches in the Football League, and scored a total of 25 goals.

References

External links

1952 births
2004 deaths
People from South Kirkby
English footballers
Association football midfielders
Burnley F.C. players
Notts County F.C. players
Darlington F.C. players
English Football League players
Sportspeople from Yorkshire